The 2021 season was Suwon Samsung Bluewings's 26th season in the K League 1 in South Korea. They competed in the 2021 K League 1 and the FA Cup.

Kits
Supplier: Puma / Sponsor: Samsung Neo QLED / Rear sponsor: Deutsch Motors / Sleeve Partner: Galaxy S21 Series, Suwon City

Management team

Squad

Squad information
The age of the players is stated as of 1 March 2021.

Transfers

Released

Loans out

Transfers in

Transfers out

Friendlies

Competitions

Overview

K League 1

League table

Results summary

Results by round

Matches
All times are Korea Standard Time (KST) – UTC+9

FA Cup

The draw for the first four rounds was held on 4 February 2021. The quarter-finals draw was made by Kim Byung-ji on Monday, 14 June.

Statistics

Appearances

Goal scorers

Assists

Clean sheets

Discipline

Awards

Manager

References

Suwon Samsung Bluewings
Suwon Samsung Bluewings seasons